Union Bridge may refer to:

 Union Bridge, Ottawa, in Canada, a predecessor of the Chaudière Bridge
 Union Bridge, Aberdeen, in Scotland
 Union Bridge, Tweed, between England and Scotland
 Union Bridge, Maryland, a town in the United States
 Union Bridge Historic District
 Union Bridge Company, a former American bridge builder